Alfreda Benge is a lyricist and illustrator. She was born in 1940 in Austria to a Polish mother, and came to England in 1947. Her stepfather, Ronald Benge, was a prominent librarian who established library schools in developing countries. She has been married to musician Robert Wyatt since 1974. She has contributed lyrics to many of his compositions, and has written lyrics for French musician/producer Bertrand Burgalat, and for Brazilian singer Monica Vasconcelos.

Benge studied painting at Camberwell Art School, graphics at the London School of Printing, film at the RCA, worked in film, and served as an assistant to the editor Graeme Clifford for Nicolas Roeg's Don't Look Now (1973). She has provided cover artwork for all solo albums by Robert Wyatt since 1974, as well as for albums by other musicians including Gravity by Fred Frith, Alice by Klimperei and Spanish Dance Troupe by Gorky's Zygotic Mynci. She has illustrated two children's books written by Ivor Cutler.

References

External links
.
.
Alfreda Benge at Discogs.

1940 births
English illustrators
English songwriters
Living people
Date of birth missing (living people)
Place of birth missing (living people)
British women painters
21st-century British women artists
Austrian emigrants to the United Kingdom